John Shelley (fl. 1410–1439), of Rye, Sussex and Sandwich, Kent, was an English Member of Parliament.

He was a Member (MP) of the Parliament of England for Rye in 1410, 1417, December 1421 and 1422 and for Sandwich in 1426, 1429 and 1435. He was Mayor of Rye August 1411-12 and approximately 1418–21.

References

14th-century births
15th-century deaths
15th-century English people
People from Rye, East Sussex
People from Sandwich, Kent
Members of the Parliament of England (pre-1707)
Mayors of Rye, East Sussex